Bell County is a county located in the southeast part of the U.S. state of Kentucky. As of the 2020 census, the population was 24,097. Its county seat is Pineville. The county was formed in 1867, during the Reconstruction era from parts of Knox and Harlan counties and augmented from Knox County in 1872. The county is named for Joshua Fry Bell, a US Representative. It was originally called "Josh Bell", but on January 31, 1873, the Kentucky legislature shortened the name to "Bell",

History
Bell County is considered a "Moist" county, a classification between dry and wet in terms of alcohol sales. The County changed to moist by a vote in September 2015, that approved alcohol-by-the-drink sales in Middlesboro, Kentucky. On June 23, 2020, Middlesboro voters approved a "wet" status by 1,215 to 653 votes.  In a standard dry county, all sales of alcoholic beverages are prohibited. Under ABC terminology, a limited county is an otherwise dry county in which at least one city has approved the sale of alcohol by the drink at restaurants that both seat a state-mandated number of diners and derive no more than 30% of their revenue from alcoholic beverages. In the case of Bell County, Pineville had voted to allow alcohol by the drink in restaurants that seat at least 100 diners. This terminology was used to describe the area until the Middlesboro vote allowed retail sale of alcohol.

The Middlesborough, KY Micropolitan Statistical Area includes all of Bell County.

The Wilderness Road was constructed in 1775 through what is now Bell County.

Bell County was formed in 1867, from portions of Harlan and Knox counties. It was named for Joshua Fry Bell, an attorney and member of Congress. The county courthouse has been thrice destroyed. In 1914 and 1918, it was destroyed by fire and in 1977 nearly destroyed by flooding. The documents stored there were destroyed as well. The flood occurred in April 1977 and although it caused extensive damage, the historical courthouse survived with substantial water damage to the interior.

The community of "South America" (known as Frakes since the 1930s) in Bell County appears to have been established in the Spanish Era. Spain made land grants in Old Kentucky prior to English settlement. The community of South America links southeast Kentucky to an era of Indian herbal harvest and sales much like the Daniel Boone era in the state. 

Bell County has one of the highest ratios of local peace officer deaths of any KY or U.S. county per capita, with 28 deputy sheriffs and 4 county sheriff's K-9 having been killed in the county's history. There has been considerable violence related to the prohibition of alcohol and production of moonshine.

Bell County is the only Kentucky county hosting both a State Park (Pine Mountain State Resort Park) and a National Monument (Cumberland Gap National Historical Park).

Geography

Adjacent counties
 Clay County (north)
 Leslie County (northeast)
 Harlan County (east)
 Lee County, Virginia (southeast)
 Claiborne County, Tennessee (south)
 Whitley County (southwest)
 Knox County (northwest)

National protected area
 Cumberland Gap National Historical Park (part)

Demographics

As of the census of 2000, there were 30,060 people, 12,004 households, and 8,522 families residing in the county. The racial makeup of the county was 96.02% White, 2.40% Black or African American, 0.25% Native American, 0.35% Asian, 0.03% Pacific Islander, 0.12% from other races, and 0.83% from two or more races. 0.65% of the population were Hispanic or Latino of any race.

There were 12,004 households, out of which 31.90% had children under the age of 18 living with them, 51.00% were married couples living together, 15.70% had a female householder with no husband present, and 29.00% were non-families. 26.80% of all households were made up of individuals, and 11.40% had someone living alone who was 65 years of age or older. The average household size was 2.44 and the average family size was 2.95.

The age distribution was 24.40% under the age of 18, 9.00% from 18 to 24, 28.70% from 25 to 44, 24.20% from 45 to 64, and 13.70% who were 65 years of age or older. The median age was 37 years. For every 100 females there were 91.60 males. For every 100 females age 18 and over, there were 88.00 males.

The median income for a household in the county was $19,057, and the median income for a family was $23,818. Males had a median income of $24,521 versus $19,975 for females. The per capita income for the county was $11,526. About 26.70% of families and 31.10% of the population were below the poverty line, including 42.00% of those under age 18 and 21.80% of those age 65 or over.

Politics

Education
Three public school districts operate in the county:

Bell County School District
The largest of the three in enrollment and by far the largest in geographic scope. The Bell County School District operates six mainstream K–8 "school centers", one alternative school, one high school, and a newly commissioned technology center built to replace the aging vocational center. It is located on the high school campus and the buildings are connected by an elevated, enclosed walkway. The new technology center is also slated to house the County Board of Education pending its move from their office in the city of Pineville building. Lone Jack High School (in Fourmile) and the old Bell County High School were consolidated into Bell County High School in the early 1980s.

Middlesboro Independent Schools
The second-largest of the three, with boundaries coinciding exactly with the corporate limits of Middlesboro. The district operates one elementary school, one middle school, and one high school. The two elementary schools are separate facilities that share the same campus design (both schools are designed in an "X" shape), and the middle and high schools are separate facilities on one campus on the west side of town. In recent years Middlesboro Independent Schools has leased the "X" shaped building formerly used as East End Intermediate to a local church.

Pineville Independent Schools
The county's smallest district; its boundaries generally, but do not exactly, follow the corporate limits of Pineville. The district operates Pineville School; An elementary, middle, and high school.

Communities

Cities
 Middlesboro (also spelled Middlesborough)
 Pineville (county seat)

Census-designated place
 Arjay

Other unincorporated communities

 Beverly
 Black Snake
 Blackmont
 Colmar
 Cubage
 Field
 Fonde
 Fourmile
 Frakes
 Harbell
 Hutch
 Ingram
 Jaybel
 Jenson
 Keenox
 Kettle Island
 Meldrum
 Miracle
 Mocking Bird Branch
 Noetown
 Oaks
 Olcott
 Ponza
 Premier
 Pruden‡
 Red Oak
 Rella
 Stoney Fork
 Stony Fork Junction
 Sugar Run
 Tejay
 Timsley
 Tuggleville
 Varilla
 Wallsend
 Wasioto
Flatshoales

Notable people
 George Samuel Hurst
 Lee Majors
 Matt Jones (radio host)

See also

 Dry county
 Hensley Settlement
 Middlesborough, KY Micropolitan Statistical Area
 National Register of Historic Places listings in Bell County, Kentucky

References

External links
 The Kentucky Highlands Project
 Bell County, Kentucky - USGenWeb
 Bell County, Kentucky - Kentucky Atlas & Gazetteer
 Bell County, Kentucky Tourism Commission

 
1867 establishments in Kentucky
Kentucky counties
Counties of Appalachia
Populated places established in 1867